The 1995 Pacific Tigers football team represented the University of the Pacific as a member of Big West Conference during the 1995 NCAA Division I-A football season. Led by fourth-year head coach Chuck Shelton, Pacific compiled an overall record 3–8 with a conference mark of 2–4, tying for eighth place in the Big West. The Tigers offense scored 240 points while the defense allowed 439 points. 

On December 20, 1995, the school announced it was dropping its football program, citing financial concerns.

Schedule

References

Pacific
Pacific Tigers football seasons
Pacific Tigers football